Xeranoplium is a genus of beetles in the family Cerambycidae, containing the following species:

 Xeranoplium bicolor Chemsak & Linsley, 1963
 Xeranoplium flavofemoratum Chemsak & Linsley, 1963
 Xeranoplium gracilis Fisher, 1932
 Xeranoplium peninsulare Chemsak & Linsley, 1963
 Xeranoplium pubescens Chemsak & Giesbert, 1986
 Xeranoplium puncticolle Chemsak & Linsley, 1963
 Xeranoplium ruficolle Chemsak & Linsley, 1963
 Xeranoplium tricallosum (Knull, 1938)

References

Hesperophanini